Gramada ("heap, pile") is a town in northwestern Bulgaria, part of Vidin Province. It is the administrative centre of the homonymous Gramada Municipality, which lies in the central part of Vidin Province. As of December 2009, the town has a population of 1,647 inhabitants.

Municipality

Gramada municipality is situated in a plain and is crossed by the rivers Vidbol, Kormanitsa, Gramada River and Yasova Bara. The municipality is mainly agricultural, cultivating grain, vines, fruits and vegetables.

Points of interest
East of Gramada there is a powerful medium-wave broadcasting station built in 1973 called Vidin transmitter. Its signals can be easily received in the whole of Europe. It works on 576 kHz and on 1224 kHz with a power of 500 kW. For transmission on 576 kHz a  guyed mast equipped with a cage antenna at its lower part is used. For the transmission on 1224 kHz four guyed masts, insulated against ground, each equipped with a cage antenna, are used, which allows a switchable directional pattern.

Honour
Gramada Glacier on Smith Island, South Shetland Islands is named after Gramada.

References

External links
 Gramada municipality page at the Vidin Province website 

Towns in Bulgaria
Populated places in Vidin Province